Marthã Fernando Gonçalves Pimenta (born 20 June 1997), simply known as Marthã, is a Brazilian footballer who plays as a midfielder for Santo André.

Club career
He made his Ukrainian Premier League debut for FC Lviv on 22 July 2018 in a game against FC Arsenal Kyiv.

Honours
Ceará
Copa do Nordeste: 2020

References

External links
 
 

1997 births
Footballers from São Paulo
Living people
Brazilian footballers
Association football midfielders
Campeonato Brasileiro Série A players
Campeonato Brasileiro Série B players
FC Lviv players
Ceará Sporting Club players
Clube de Regatas Brasil players
Ukrainian Premier League players
Brazilian expatriate footballers
Expatriate footballers in Ukraine
Brazilian expatriate sportspeople in Ukraine